Tifany Huot-Marchand (born 10 May 1994) is a French short track speed skater. She competed in the women's 500 metres at the 2018 Winter Olympics.

References

External links

1994 births
Living people
French female short track speed skaters
Olympic short track speed skaters of France
Short track speed skaters at the 2018 Winter Olympics
Short track speed skaters at the 2022 Winter Olympics
Sportspeople from Besançon
World Short Track Speed Skating Championships medalists
21st-century French women